The Kenyan Ambassador in Paris is the official representative of the Government in Nairobi to the Government of France. As of 2020, she is concurrently also accredited in Lisbon, Belgrade and the Holy See.

List of representatives

References 

 
France
Kenya